Stefan Nielsen (born 5 April 1986) is a Danish handballer, currently playing for Danish Handball League side Viborg HK. He joined the club in 2007.

During his youth career, Nielsen made several appearances for the Danish national youth handball teams.

External links
 Player Info 

1986 births
Living people
Danish male handball players
Viborg HK players